Federal Route 196, or Jalan Panglima Bayu-Rantau Panjang-Jeram Pendah (formerly Kelantan State Route D22), is a federal road in Kelantan, Malaysia. It is an alternative route to Tumpat and Pengkalan Kubor from Rantau Panjang. The Kilometre Zero of the Federal Route 196 starts at Panglima Bayu.

Features

There is a customs checkpoint at Jalan Besar (south section) towards Rantau Panjang town centre.

At most sections, the Federal Route 196 was built under the JKR R5 road standard, allowing maximum speed limit of up to 90 km/h.

List of junctions and towns

References

Malaysian Federal Roads